Wallbach may refer to:

Wallbach (Bad Säckingen), a village in the state of Baden-Württemberg, part of Bad Säckingen
Wallbach, Thuringia, a municipality in the state of Thuringia
Wallbach, Switzerland, a municipality in the canton of Aargau

See also
Walbach (disambiguation)
Wahlbach (disambiguation)